Robert Browne (by 1507 – 21 December 1558), of Leiston, Suffolk and the Middle Temple, London, was an English politician.

He was a Member (MP) of the Parliament of England for Dunwich in 1542, 1545 and 1554.

References

1558 deaths
People from Suffolk Coastal (district)
Members of the Middle Temple
English MPs 1542–1544
English MPs 1545–1547
English MPs 1554
People from Leiston
Year of birth uncertain